Justinas Usonis (born 1975) – Attorney at law, PhD, Associate Professor at Private Law dept. in Vilnius University Faculty of Law, member of group for drafting a new Lithuanian Labour Code (2015).

Biography 
1998 graduated Vilnius University Law faculty.
In 2006 he gained a PhD in social sciences, law. Lecture of Labour law.

Since 2004 attorney at law; from 1998 to 2004 lawyer at Lithuanian Road Carriers Association „Linava“; from 2006 to 2012 head of Labour Law and Social Security dept. at Mykolas Romeris University Faculty of Law, assoc. Prof.;  from 2014 member of Court of honour at Lithuanian Bar Association; member of Lithuanian Society of Labour law and social security.
Author of scientific publications, reads presentations on Labour law.
From 2009 head of Employment relationship committee at Confederation of Lithianian Industrialists (LPK). From 2014 Assoc. Prof. at Private Law dept. in Vilnius University Faculty of Law.
2015 participated in group of researchers for drafting a new Labour code of Republic of Lithuania.

Speaks Lithuanian, English and Russian languages.

References 

1975 births
Living people
Lithuanian legal scholars
Labour law scholars
Lawyers from Vilnius
Vilnius University alumni
Academic staff of Vilnius University
Academic staff of Mykolas Romeris University
20th-century Lithuanian lawyers
21st-century Lithuanian lawyers